Lia Dekker (born 24 January 1987) is a Dutch swimmer who specializes in breaststroke. Dekker holds the national record in the 200 metres breaststroke in the 50 m pool. She is the younger sister of Inge Dekker, 2008 Olympic champion in the 4×100 metre freestyle relay.

Swimming career
At the Dutch National Championships in June 2008, Dekker qualified for the European SC Championships 2008 in Rijeka, Croatia. A week before the European Championships, Dekker broke the national record in the 200 m breaststroke, which was set by Linda Moes during the 1988 Olympics in Seoul, South Korea. The day after she also lowered the national record in the 100 m breaststroke, held by Moniek Nijhuis since 2007. In Rijeka, Dekker placed 18th in the 100 m breaststroke and 20th in the 200 m breaststroke. At the Amsterdam Swim Cup 2009 she qualified herself for the 2009 World Aquatics Championships in Rome, Italy in the 100 m breaststroke, although she lost her national record to Nijhuis. In the 200 m breaststroke Dekker lowered her own national record by two seconds, but failed to qualify for Rome for this event.

Personal bests

See also

List of Dutch records in swimming

References

External links
Official website

1987 births
Living people
Dutch female breaststroke swimmers
People from Assen
Sportspeople from Drenthe